#4 is the debut studio album by the Japanese rock band, Ling tosite Sigure. It was released on November 9, 2005 under Nakano Records label.

Almost exactly 15 years after the release of #4 the band decided to release a remastered version on November 11, 2020 titled #4 -Retornado- (or #4 -Retornade-).

Track listing 
All tracks written and composed by TK.

References

External links 
 Ling tosite sigure discography 

2005 debut albums
Ling Tosite Sigure albums